The 1943–44 Holy Cross Crusaders men's basketball team represented The College of the Holy Cross during the 1943–44 NCAA men's basketball season. The head coach was Albert Riopel, coaching the crusaders in his second season. The team finished with an overall record of 6–8.

Schedule

|-

References

Holy Cross Crusaders men's basketball seasons
Holy Cross